Kilmadock parish (Scottish Gaelic Cille Mo Dog), named for Saint Cadoc, containing the settlements of Doune, Deanston, Buchany, Argaty, Hill of Row, Drumvaich, and Delvorich, is situated in Stirling council area, Scotland, and is on the southern border of the former county of Perthshire.

The River Forth runs  along its southern boundary, and the River Teith runs east-south-eastward through the centre. A flat tract of considerable breadth lies along the Forth Valley, flanked on each side by a hill-ridge. The valley is traversed by the Teith, and an upland tract, part of the Braes of Doune, ascends to the summit of  Uamh Mhòr on the northern boundary.

Gallery

References 

Parishes in Perthshire